MSG: The Messenger (also known as MSG: The Messenger of God) is a 2015 Indian Hindi-language faith-based film written by and starring Gurmeet Ram Rahim Singh in his film debut. He is also credited as co-director, co-cinematographer, co-editor, songwriter and stuntman. The film was released worldwide on 13 February 2015. It follows a spiritual leader, played by Singh and largely based on himself, on a quest to eradicate drugs and gender-related issues.

MSG: The Messenger received largely negative reviews from critics, who accused it of being a propaganda film promoting Singh's teachings, while also severely criticising its quality. It was also controversial for being allegedly insulting towards Sikhs. It was followed the same year by a direct sequel, MSG-2 The Messenger, and later by two more instalments, The Warrior Lion Heart and Hind Ka Napak Ko Jawab, with Singh similarly involved in all of them.

Synopsis
Guruji is a spiritual leader who has a huge follower base. He has accepted the challenge of eradicating social evils including drugs and gender-related issues that have been prevailing in the society. Those with vested interests and apathetic towards the welfare of the society are now disturbed as there's someone who has taken control of the situation. They conspire to kill him.

Cast

 Gurmeet Ram Rahim Singh as Guruji 
 Daniel Kaleb as Jalebi Bai
 Flora Saini as Muskan
 Jayshree Soni as Kasam
 Olexandra Semen as Alice
 Gaurav Gera as Bhondu
 Jay Singh Rajpoot as Jet Bhai
 Himanshu Tiwari as Tiwari Don
 Raju Pandit as Khurana

Production
The film was shot at various locations of Maharashtra, Karnataka and Kerala. The movie also features 1 million, three hundred-thousand extras. The film was completed in 67 days. The cast had almost no training in film or acting. For the song 'Never Ever' about 125,000 performers continued their shot for three days, and on a count of three, 70 thousand candles were lit within 45 seconds. Singh held a three-day concert at the Shah Satnam Ji Stadium in Sirsa, Haryana, from 16 August, which is part of the movie.

Certification
The film was denied a release certificate by the Central Board of Film Certification and was sent to a revising committee. The members of the CBFC objected to the portrayal of Singh as a God in the movie. On 15 January 2015 the film was cleared for screening by the Film Certification Appellate Tribunal. Singh denied that he had called himself God in the film (at the time the film was titled, MSG: Messenger of God). He further added that there was nothing objectionable in his film and that the CBFC had muted just two words. Punjab and Haryana High Court also allowed the release of the film. The film was fully cleared by the board with a U Certificate and released on 13 February 2015.

Promotion
The trailer of the film was released on 19 December 2014 and crossed over 1 million views on YouTube within 24 hours. On 16 January 2015, MSG: The Messenger premiered at Leisure Valley ground, a large park in Gurgaon city used for exhibitions and conventions. A team from Asia Book and India Book of Records recorded the official number of people gathered as 157,231 for the promotion.

Reception

Critical response
The film received mostly negative reviews. Criticism focused on the self-aggrandizing nature of the film. Raja Sen, writing for Rediff, refused to rate the movie. "This is not a movie," he said. He described the film as a "propaganda piece" for "self-styled spiritual leader" Singh, and stated that the film "might be a theatrical release, but this can, by no means, be called a piece of cinema." The Indian Express described the film as "excruciatingly awful only for non believers." DNA called the film "three hours of torture so painful that you start laughing at yourself".

Rohit Vats reviewing for Hindustan Times urged readers to "watch it only if your survival depended on it". Bollywood Hungama stated that the film "can be watched once... purely for the dynamics and the histrionics of the endearing Gurmeet Ram Rahim Singh Ji Insan". Times of India rated it one out of five stars, commenting that "the one star is strictly for Babaji's intriguing choice of outfits. A multi-coloured crochet two-piece (tight tees and knee-length pants) takes the cake."

Box office
The box office gross of the movie has been contested.

The 2015 Cricket World Cup, which kicked off the following day, was also expected to detract from later ticket sales.

Protests
Various Sikh groups protested the release of the movie and demanded that it be banned on the basis that it was offensive to Sikhs. However, a Dera Sacha Sauda spokesperson responded, "There is nothing against which the protests need to be done."

Soundtrack

The music was composed by Gurmeet Ram Rahim Singh, and a sequence of the movie takes place as a live concert. The soundtrack album consists of 7 songs, all written and sung by Singh, himself.

Track listing

Sequel
A sequel, MSG-2 The Messenger, was released on 18 September 2015.

References

External links
 
 
 

2010s Hindi-language films
2015 films
Indian thriller films
2015 thriller films
Hindi-language thriller films
Film controversies in India